Mashaallah was an American-bred, British-trained  Thoroughbred race horse. He is notable for his performances in 1992 when he won Group One races in Italy, Germany and Ireland.

Background
Mashaallah was bred in Kentucky by William Stamps Farish III. He was sired by the Triple Crown winner Nijinsky out of the Round Table mare Homespun. He was thus a full brother of the Oak Leaf Stakes winner Folk Art and the minor stakes winner Sportin' Life. He is inbred 4x4 to Nearco, meaning that this stallion appears twice in the fourth generation of Mashaallah's pedigree (see below).

As a yearling Mashaallah was sold for $525,000 at the 1989 Keeneland July Sale. He was trained throughout his career by John Gosden at Newmarket, Suffolk.

His name derives from the Arabic saying Masha'Allah- "whatever God wills".

Racing career

1991: three-year-old season
Mashaallah was a late-maturing colt who did not appear on the racecourse until June of his three-year-old season, when he ran unplaced in a minor race at Sandown. Two weeks later he beat twenty runners to record his first win at Doncaster.
He appeared to be improving when he "easily" won a handicap at York in July, but was then off the course for almost ten months.

1992: four-year-old season
1992 saw Mashaallah improve from a modest handicapper- rated 96- to a three-time Group One winner capable of competing and winning at the highest level in middle and long distance races. In May he ran three times, winning a handicap at the Newmarket Guineas meeting, running second in the Listed Aston Park Stakes at Newbury, and then holding off Glity by a head in the Listed Prix de la Porte de Madrid at Longchamp.

Mashaallah was then move straight into Group One company to face an international field in the Gran Premio di Milano. Ridden by Steve Cauthen, Mashaallah took the lead two furlongs from the finish and ran on strongly to beat the French-trained filly Saganeca by three-quarters of a length. Mashaallah was then placed in the Princess of Wales's Stakes and the Prix Maurice de Nieuil before disappointing when finishing last of the six runners in the Aral-Pokal at Gelsenkirchen.

In September, however, Mashaallah produced the best form of his career. He returned to Germany for the Grosser Preis von Baden in which he led from the start to win by one and a quarter lengths from the German Horse of the Year Platini. He was then sent to Ireland for the Irish St. Leger at the Curragh, where he faced a field of top-class stayers including Vintage Crop (Melbourne Cup), Drum Taps (Ascot Gold Cup x2), Snurge (St Leger, Canadian International) and Rock Hopper (Hardwicke Stakes x2). He was sent into the lead by Cauthen half a mile from home and ran on well under pressure to beat Snurge by a neck.

In his final two races of the season Mashaallah finished unplaced in the Prix de l'Arc de Triomphe and the Canadian International Stakes.

1993: five-year-old season
Mashaallah ran six times in 1993, but was unable to recapture his best form, and recorded his only win when he was dropped in class to take a minor stakes race at York

His best performance of the year came at Longchamp in October, where he led for most of the way in the Prix Royal Oak, but was caught in the last strides and beaten a short neck by Raintrap.

1994: six-year-old season
Mashhallah's finished unplaced in two Grade I turf races at Hollywood Park in 1994 but won the Grade III Jim Murray Memorial Handicap.

Assessment
Mashaallah's highest Racing Post Rating (RPR) was 124.

Stud career
After his retirement, Mashaallah was exported to Chile where he stood as a sire at the Haras Carioca. He has sired a number of winners, but nothing of top class.

Pedigree

Mashaallah was inbred 4x4 to Nearco.

References

1988 racehorse births
Racehorses bred in the United States
Racehorses trained in the United Kingdom
Irish Classic Race winners
Thoroughbred family 17-b